Wong Yue (born Wong Chi-kuen; 26 October 1955 – 15 May 2008) was a Hong Kong martial arts film actor.

Background
Born Wong Chi-kuen in Hong Kong on 26 October 1955. He starred in many Shaw Brothers Studio films and is known for his comic roles in films with Gordon Liu, such as Dirty Ho, Spiritual Boxer II, The 36th Chamber of Shaolin and Eight Diagram Pole Fighter.

He was sometimes credited as Wong Yu and as Wang Yu, but is a different person than an older Shaw Brothers star, Jimmy Wang Yu. He was renamed after him as a revenge of producer Shaw against the original Wang Yu.

Death
Wong Yue died in Hong Kong on May 16, 2008 from acute pneumonia.

Filmography
The Bloody Fists (1972)
The Golden Lotus (1974)
Hong Kong 73 (1974)
The Tea House (1974)
Thirteen (1974)
The Two Faces of Love (1974)
Young Passion (1974)
Big Brother Cheng (1975)
Flying Guillotine (1975)
It's All in the Family (1975)
Spiritual Boxer (1975)
Challenge of the Masters (1976)
The Criminals (1976)
Emperor Chien Lung (1976)
King Gambler (1976)
The Last Tempest (1976)
The Snake Prince (1976)
White Butterfly Killer (1976)
The Adventures of Emperor Chien Lung (1977)
Executioners from Shaolin (1977)
He Has Nothing But Kung Fu (1977)
The 36th Chamber of Shaolin (1978)
Dirty Kung Fu (1978)
The Proud Youth (1978)
Dirty Ho (1979)
The Kung Fu Instructor (1979)
Spiritual Boxer II (1979)
The Kid With a Tattoo (1980)
Rendezvous With Death (1980)
Swift Sword (1980)
The Young Avenger (1980)
The Battle for the Republic of China (1981)
Challenge of the Gamesters (1981)
Lion vs Lion (1981)
Notorious Eight (1981)
The Big Sting (1982)
Kid from Kwangtung (1982)
Winner Takes All (1982)
Young Vagabond (1982)
Eight-Diagram Pole Fighter (1983)
Lady Is the Boss (1983)
Mercenaries from Hong Kong (1983)
The Shy Boy (1983)
Take Care, Your Majesty (1983)
Tales of a Eunuch (1983)
Comedy (1984)
Dress Off for Life (1984)
How to Choose a Royal Bride (1984)
Wits of the Brats (1984)
Crazy Shaolin Disciples (1985)
The Flying Mr. B (1985)
The Girl With the Diamond Slipper (1985)
The Master Strikes Back (1985)
Why Me? (1985)
The Innocent Interloper (1986)
Seventh Curse (1986)
Dragons Forever (1988)
Rouge (1988)
The Rise and Fall of Qing Dynasty 2 (1988)
Framed (1989)
The Godfather's Daughter Mafia Blues (1991)
Spiritually a Cop (1991)
Center Stage (1991)
Handsome Siblings (1992)
Peach Sex Noxious Star (1993)
Power of Love (1993)
Legend of the Liquid Sword (1993)
Once Upon a Time in China Series: The Final Victory (1996)
Dance of a Dream (2001)

External links

Biography at Hong Kong Cinemagic

1955 births
Hong Kong male actors
Hong Kong male film actors
Shaw Brothers Studio
2008 deaths